Tony Greenfield (26 April 1931 – 19 March 2019) was a British statistical consultant and academic. He was formerly Head of Process Computing and Statistics at the British Iron and Steel Research Association, Sheffield, and Professor of Medical Computing and Statistics at Queen's University, Belfast.

Until he retired, at the age of 80, he was a visiting professor to the Industrial Statistics Research Unit of the University of Newcastle-upon-Tyne and to the Universitat Politècnica de Catalunya.

Greenfield co-authored Design and Analyse your Experiments with Minitab with Andrew Metcalfe and Engineering Statistics with Matlab. His inaugural lecture (1980) at Queen's University is still sold as a booklet. His first book, Research Methods for Postgraduates is highly regarded on both sides of the Atlantic and is now in its third edition, published by Wiley. He has also had a strong hand in The Pocket Statistician, Statistical Practice in Business and Industry and an Encyclopaedia of Statistics in Quality and Reliability. One of his contributions to his local community of Great Hucklow is the editing of a history of lead mining in the area: Lead in the Veins.

Tony was a founding member and Past President of European Network for Business and Industrial Statistics and for many years he was a prominent member of the Royal Statistical Society. He was the first editor of RSS News and of the ENBIS newsletter and magazine. In its first ten years, ENBIS grew to a membership base of around 1500 practitioners spread across more than sixty countries.

Tony was a Chartered Statistician (CStat) and a Chartered Scientist (CSci).

Early life
Tony Greenfield was born in Chapeltown, South Yorkshire on 26 April 1931 to Geoffrey James Greenfield (1900–1978) and Hilda Aynsley (1903–1976).

Tony Greenfield worked in an iron mine when he left Bedford School at the age of 17.  He later worked in coal mines, a brass tube factory, and in a copper mine and studied mining engineering at Imperial College London.  He received the diploma in journalism from the Regent Street Polytechnic, worked on the Sunday Express and Sunday Mirror before turning to technical journalism for ten years.  He was an active member of the Sheffield Junior Chamber of Commerce of which he was chairman of the Business Affairs committee and editor of The Hub, the chamber's monthly magazine.  At the 1963 conference in Tel Aviv of Junior Chamber International he was acknowledged as the editor of the best junior chamber magazine in the world.

He moved into the steel industry to write technical reports for Operations Research (OR) scientists.  There he found satisfaction in solving production problems, studied OR, mathematics, statistics and computing leading to an external degree from University College London.  He moved into steel research and became head of process computing and statistics. Much of his work was in design and analysis of experiments for which he received his PhD.  When the laboratories closed he joined the medical faculty of University of Sheffield where he was statistician to a multi-centre study of cot death.  He taught medical statistics to undergraduates, supported post graduates and medical staff with consultancy and co-authored one of the first interactive statistics packages to be written on Prime computers.

Career
Tony moved to Belfast as professor of medical computing and statistics at Queen's University. Early retirement enabled him to work as a research consultant.

Greenfield's passion was to persuade all scientists and engineers to write, speak and present their work in language that other people understand well enough to use in some ways.  And, like W B Yeats, he asks scientists to "think like a wise man but communicate in the language of the people." Like Isaac Asimov, he was "on fire to explain," and didn't "indulge in scholarly depth."

He believed strongly that the economic fortune of Europe depends on the success in the world markets of our manufacturing industries.

"Statisticians and statistical practitioners across Europe know that statistical methods have improved business and industrial performance and can continue do so in the future," he says. "Our national quality of life will be improved and secured if we can communicate the philosophy, as well as the methods, of statistics to engineers and others in the manufacturing and the service industries.

"Businessmen and engineers need to understand the benefits of applied probability and statistics; they need to understand how the methods are applied to their own work; they need to be fully converted to a frame of mind that will make them automatically question sources of variability in everything that they do and, without outside prompting, adopt the statistical approach.

He and others founded ENBIS to stimulate the application of statistical methods to economic and technical development and to business and industry across the whole of Europe. They have created a networking forum for the exchange of ideas between statistical practitioners.  He has spread this passion by speaking in many cities across Europe from Tel Aviv, through Turin, Budapest, Ljubljana, Copenhagen, Brussels and London.

Awards
 Chambers Medal for outstanding services to the RSS.
 George Box Medal by ENBIS for Outstanding Contributions to Industrial Statistics.
 William G Hunter Award by the American Society for Quality for the creative development and application of statistical techniques to problem-solving in the quality field.
 The Royal Statistical Society awards the Greenfield Industrial Medal for contributions to the effective application of statistical methods to the manufacturing and allied industries.

Personal life
Tony was a member of the Longstone Local History Society, the Bakewell Photographic Circle, Writers in the Peak, the Hucklows Community Spirit, and the Parisot (Tarn-et-Garonne)/Hucklows Twinning Committee.

As for politics, Tony was sent to a public school at the age of 13 and was alienated by the right-wing attitudes of the staff and boys.  This made him a radical for life. He joined the Liberal Party, eventually becoming a Prospective Parliamentary Candidate (PPC) for Sheffield Hallam, but was faced with ideas with which he didn't agree so he joined the Labour Party (UK) and was active for more than 20 years in the High Peak constituency.

Greenfield died on 19 March 2019 at the age of 87.

Books
Research Methods for Postgraduates, 3rd Edition by Tony Greenfield (Editor), Sue Greener (Editor)

Statistical Practice in Business and Industry by Shirley Coleman (Editor), Tony Greenfield (Co-Editor), Dave Stewardson (Co-Editor), Douglas C. Montgomery (Co-Editor)

Design and Analyse Your Experiment Using Minitab by Tony Greenfield, Andrew V. Metcalfe

Presented papers (a selection)
Computational techniques as an aid in physical metallurgy
ISI conference, Leeds 1971
A statistical approach to oxygen steelmaking
International Steelmakers' Conference, Amsterdam, 1973
Discriminant analysis as a diagnostic aid 
IEEE conference on 'Computers for analysis and control in medical and biological research' 1974
Iterative and sequential methods for sine wave fitting
Colloquium on 'Methods of study of biological rhythms', Manchester 1975
Training statistical consultants for the pharmaceutical industry
Seminar of 'Statisticians in the Pharmaceutical Industry' 1979
Reproducibility in histopathology
Conference on 'statistics in medicine', Sheffield 1980
Simulation is a tool for improving NHS procedures
CQI and the NHS, BMA, October 1997

Published papers (a selection)
Technology to Pay for Tomorrow
New Scientist, August 1970
Discriminant value of thyroid function tests (with Barnett, Howlett, Hudson and Smith)
British Medical Journal, April 1973
Metabolic profile study of patients receiving lithium carbonate (with Birch)
British Journal of Pharmacology 1974
Lithium therapy and alkaline earth metal metabolism (with Birch)
Psychological Medicine 1977
British Steel's Research Strategy
The Times, 16 January 1978
Computers and Health
Inaugural lecture, Queen's University, Belfast, 1980
The Road to Better Diagnosis
Proceedings of the Hospital Physicists Association and Biological Engineering Society, 1981
Laboratory data on ICU admissions (with Batchelor)
Anaesthesia, 1982
Introducing computers studies to an established medical curriculum
In 'Meeting the Challenge: Informatics and Medical Education’ – North Holland 1983
The Medical Effects of the Seat Belt Legislation in the United Kingdom (with Rutherford)
DHSS report  1985
Biometric Review and Advice to the Government of Bolivia
ODA report 1988
Communicating Statistics
JRSS (A)  1993 part 2
Femoral neck and total body bone mineral density predict incident non-spine fractures  (with Greenfield DM and Eastell R)
American Society for Bone and Mineral Research, Cincinnati, September 1997
Simulation of clinical trials
Clinical Research Manual Supplement 24 (2007), published by Euromed Communications

See also
George E. P. Box
William G Hunter

References

Box Medal: RSS News, December 2009, article on page 10: Tony wins ENBIS award
New Scientist review of Research Methods for Postgraduates, 2nd Edition

External links
 Longstone Local History Group – Tony Greenfield’s St
RSS Stats Life obituary

1931 births
2019 deaths
Academics of Queen's University Belfast
English statisticians
People educated at Bedford School
Alumni of University College London
Alumni of Imperial College London
Academics of the University of Sheffield